Brian "Buck" Keich is a mountain bike racer. He won the 2005 Single Speed World Championship in State College, PA.  In 2006 he traveled to 2006 race held in  Sweden to defend his World Championship title but came in second.  Buck's current primary racing sponsor is himself. Buck also has a hobby of crafting Dutch Bags in his free time.

External links
Interview on Dirt Rag

American male cyclists
Single-speed mountain bikers
Living people
American mountain bikers
Year of birth missing (living people)